American School of Grenoble is an American international school located in the Cité Scolaire Internationale in Grenoble, France. It serves ages 10–18.

See also
 List of French international schools in the United States and Canada
 American migration to France

References

External links
 American School of Grenoble

American international schools in France
Schools in Grenoble
Secondary schools in France
Lycées in Isère